Dan Bradley is an American stunt coordinator and second unit film director. He has worked on Independence Day, Spider-Man 2, Spider-Man 3, The Bourne Supremacy, The Bourne Ultimatum, Superman Returns, Indiana Jones and the Kingdom of the Crystal Skull, Where The Wild Things Are, Quantum of Solace, and Mission: Impossible – Ghost Protocol.

Bradley was born and raised in the San Fernando Valley and his early street racing around Van Nuys led him into his career in stunts.

He was originally cast to portray Jason Voorhees in Friday the 13th Part VI: Jason Lives but was replaced by C.J. Graham. Despite this the scenes he filmed were still included in the film making this the third instance of 2 actors portraying Jason in one film.

Bradley served as the stunt coordinator and second unit for the car chase scenes in The Dukes of Hazard.  Johnny Knoxville praised him saying "everyone in Hollywood wants Dan Bradley to shoot their car stuff" and cited him as a factor in his taking a role in the film.

In July 2008, Bradley was announced as the director for the MGM remake of the 1984 Cold War movie Red Dawn, and was attached to the supernatural action feature Hellified for Paramount Pictures. In 2016, he made his debut in Indian Cinema, as the Second Unit Director and Stunt co-ordinator of the Bollywood film Ghayal Once Again.

References

External links 
 

Living people
Special effects coordinators
Year of birth missing (living people)